Antonio José Navarro Wolff (born 9 July 1948) is an engineer, a former combatant and a Colombian politician.

Navarro used to be a former Commandant and leader of the 19th of April Movement (M-19), a former guerrilla movement that operated in Colombia in the 1970s and 1980s. After the demobilization through a peace agreement of the M-19, Navarro and others formed the M-19 Democratic Alliance, a political party of which Navarro became a leader of entering mainstream politics in Colombia. In 1990 he ran as a M-19 political candidate during the Colombian presidential elections finishing third and receiving 12.48% of the votes; he ran again unsuccessfully in the 1994 presidential election, and attempted to run for the 2006 presidential elections but lost the candidacy of his party during the primaries. In 1991 he was elected to the National Constituent Assembly, of which became Co-President along with Álvaro Gómez Hurtado and Horacio Serpa Uribe; it was this Assembly that drafted the Colombian Constitution of 1991 which remains the supreme law of the country.

Navarro has also served in Congress, being elected to serve both in the Chamber from 1998 to 2002, and the Senate from 2002 to 2006 and again since 2014; and elected Mayor of Pasto serving from 1995 to 1998, and Governor of Nariño from 2008 to 2012.

Before M-19 
Antonio José was born on 9 July 1948 in Pasto to Rafael Navarro Uribe and María Emma Wolff Pizarro. In 1972, Navarro graduated as a sanitary engineer from the University of Valle, after which he took postgraduate courses and eventually became a professor at the same university. He studied Environmental Engineering at Loughborough University, UK in 1976 on a scholarship from the Rockefeller Foundation, the British Council and the International Development Research Center (IDRC) of Canada.

As a sanitary engineer, he was an adviser of the Social Medicine Department of the University of Valle (1972), coordinator of the Multidisciplinary Research Centre for Rural Development (CIMDER, 1972–1977), international adviser of the IDRC (1976–1978), Professor at the University of Valle (1972–1978), director of the Curriculum of Sanitary Engineering at the university, and a private consultant.

Militancy in M-19
At the end of the 1970s, he became a part of the guerilla group M-19. Within the M-19, Navarro ascended to second-in-command of the organization. One of the most controversial episodes of M-19 was the take-over of the Palace of Justice by armed guerrillas.  They pretended to demand a trial of President Belisario Betancur for violation of the peace accords. During the operation led by security forces to retake the Palace, a large group of guerrillas, civilians, magistrates and soldiers lost their lives— at least 53 civilian casualties were registered, including several members of Colombia's Supreme Court of Justice. The siege has been catalogued as a holocaust and massacre by the Inter-American Court of Human Rights.

Peace negotiations 
Navarro coordinated peace negotiations for this movement during President Betancur' government in 1984 and 1985. He was named head of the Commission to organize the National Dialogue, along with Vera Grabe, Alfonso Jacquin, Andrés Almarales and Israel Santamaría. Talks were broken off, truces failed and the peace process died. In May 1985, the talks collapsed after an attack in a cafeteria in the city of Cali, when a soldier threw a grenade that exploded 10 cm away from Navarro, who was severely wounded. The facial nerve that controls the left part the jaw was destroyed and he lost his left leg below the knee. M-19 received news that Navarro was to be attacked in the hospital, so he was evacuated to Mexico where the leg was amputated. He received a prosthesis in Cuba.

Later, Carlos Pizarro carried out peace negotiations with the government of President Virgilio Barco. The peace agreement was on signed 11 March 1990.

After signing the peace agreement, M-19 nominated its leader, Carlos Pizarro Leongómez to run as candidate for the presidency, but he was assassinated on a commercial flight from Bogotá to Barranquilla on 26 April 1990. After Pizarro's burial, the leaders of M-19 met and decided to continue with the peace process. They nominated Navarro for the presidency, who came in third in the balloting.

Political life 
In the 2000s, M-19 entered a leftist coalition of parties called the Alternative Democratic Pole and Navarro became its Secretary General.

Antonio Navarro has been mayor of the city of Pasto, Congressman of Colombia and was one of the three collegiate presidents of the Constituent Assembly of Colombia writing the Colombian Constitution of 1991. He has served as Colombian Minister of Health.

In 2006, he ran for the presidency of Colombia, but lost to Carlos Gaviria in the party primaries. He then ran for the Senate and was elected. After he is elected governor of Nariño of the PDA. Later after the election of Gustavo Petro as mayor of Bogotá, Navarro was appointed Secretary of Government which takes turn as spokesman for the mayor. However resignation for personal reasons in late March 2012 in charge subsequently assuming the Progressive Movement spokesperson. He is also a member of Washington D.C. based think tank the Inter-American Dialogue.

Popular culture
Navarro is portrayed by the actor Fabio Rubiano as the character of Marco Navia in TV series Escobar, el patrón del mal.

References 

 Polo Democratico Alternativo - Antonio Navarro Wolff
 terra.com.co - VoteBien: Antonio Navarro Wolff

1948 births
Living people
Colombian people of German descent
University of Valle alumni
Alumni of Loughborough University
Colombian industrial engineers
Academic staff of the University of Valle
19th of April Movement members
Colombian amputees
Candidates for President of Colombia
Members of the Constituent Assembly of Colombia
Mayors of places in Colombia
People from Pasto, Colombia
Members of the Chamber of Representatives of Colombia
Members of the Senate of Colombia
Governors of Nariño Department
Members of the Inter-American Dialogue